Vanajem (also Romanized as Vanājem; also known as Vanājān) is a village in Garmab Rural District, Chahardangeh District, Sari County, Mazandaran Province, Iran. At the 2006 census, its population was 133, in 34 families.

References 

Populated places in Sari County